MotoGP is the first of Namco's 5 game series for PlayStation, with 1 to 4 on PS2 and 5 'MotoGP' on PSP. It is based on the arcade game 500GP. There is no mention of what season it represents (if any) on the box but by the inclusion of the Muz 500 bike and the Paul Ricard track it can be deduced that at least contains some of the 1999 season - albeit with a much reduced bike/team/rider/track list. Later games in the series went on to fill out the gaps and became more of a true representation of the season/s they covered. This first installment is also notable for the inclusion of Klonoa, a character from another Namco series, appears as a playable guest character.

Reception

The game received "generally favorable reviews" according to the review aggregation website Metacritic. In Japan, Famitsu gave it a score of 35 out of 40.

David Chen of NextGen said: "It's fast and in-depth enough to satisfy the armchair 500cc-class racer, but it certainly doesn't fit the bill of 'fun for the whole gang.'"

References

External links

2000 video games
Bandai Namco Entertainment franchises
Namco games
Racing video games
Grand Prix motorcycle racing video games
PlayStation 2 games
PlayStation 2-only games
Grand Prix motorcycle racing
Video games developed in Japan
Video games set in Australia
Video games set in Brazil
Video games set in the Czech Republic
Video games set in England
Video games set in France
Video games set in Germany
Video games set in Italy
Video games set in Japan
Video games set in Malaysia
Video games set in the Netherlands
Video games set in Spain
Video games set in Portugal
Video games set in South Africa